Veronica perfoliata, commonly known as digger's speedwell, is a common perennial herb found at higher altitudes in south-eastern Australia. It is a low-growing multi-stemmed plant rising from a woody rootstock. It has rounded blue-grey foliage and sprays of intense violet-blue flowers at the end of arching branches. It is occasionally cultivated as a garden plant.

Description

Leaves are either narrow or broad egg-shaped and arranged in opposite pairs, joined to the stem either in a wedge, heart, or stem-clasping configuration. The leaf margin may be entire, finely scalloped or with approximately 10 pairs of rough or shallow sharp teeth. Plants with narrower leaves generally grow in drier situations, whereas the broad-leaf form in wetter cooler locations. Leaves have 3-9 longitudinal veins radiating from the base. Numerous woody stems grow from a rootstock and form a clump, rarely branched below the inflorescence.

Capsules are barely flattened, dull, and either rounded or sharply pointed. Flowering occurs from October to February.

Taxonomy and naming
Robert Brown first formally described the species in 1810, using V. perfoliata, in the botanical survey Prodromus Florae Novae Hollandiae. Constantine Rafinesque, Barbara Briggs and Friedrich Ehrendorfer changed the name to Parahebe perfoliata or Derwentia perfoliata, but the changes have not been accepted by the Australian Plant Census. The specific epithet (perfoliata) refers to the plant having "perfoliate" leaves, where the stem appears to be passing through the leaves. The common name "digger's speedwell" derives from a belief that the species is a reliable indicator of the presence of gold. "Speedwell" is a name for several species of veronica.

Distribution and habitat
It grows in similar areas to V. derwentiana but in shallow, often rocky soil on steep slopes rather than deeper soils in shaded sites. The broad range of the species contrasts with the belief that it indicates the presence of gold.

References

Flora of New South Wales
Flora of Victoria (Australia)
Flora of the Australian Capital Territory
perfoliata
Plants described in 1810
Taxa named by Robert Brown (botanist, born 1773)